Shahrestanak (also Romanized as Shahrestānak and Shahristānak) is a village in Asara Rural District of Asara District, Karaj County, Alborz province, Iran. At the 2006 census, its population was 1,048, in 317 families. At the most recent census of 2016, the population of the village had increased to 1,307 in 482 households; it is the largest village in its rural district.

References 

Karaj County

Populated places in Alborz Province

Populated places in Karaj County